Hakim Sabzevari University (HSU) (Daneshgah-e Hakim Sabzevari, Global WHED ID= IAU-016158) is one of the most developed public universities in Sabzevar city at Razavi Khorasan province, Iran. Hakim Sabzevari University is one of the most prestigious public universities in Iran and the oldest university in Sabzevar. HSU was established in 1973 when its name was Kar University. After the Iran revolution in 1979, this university was halted until 1987. It was reestablished in 1987 as a branch of Tarbiat Moallem University of Tehran but later became independent and it was renamed to Hakim Sabzevari University in 2011, after Hadi Sabzevari, a prominent Iranian philosopher and theologian. HSU offers 139 bachelors, masters, and Ph.D. programs to more than 8152 male and female students studying under about 263 faculty members in 10 departments. HSU is known as the dynamic in science and the leading in development university in Iran. Hakim Sabzevari University has more than 264 international students studying from different countries at this university. According to the Islamic World Science Citation Center statistics, HSU is ranked 41st in Iran amongst other universities of Ministry of Science, Research and Technology. The university currently consists of 10 faculties.

Faculties and divisions
Faculty of Sciences: Biology, Physics, Chemistry

Faculty of Engineering: Mechanical Engineering, Civil Engineering, Material Engineering, Polymer Engineering, Aerospace Engineering 

Faculty of Mathematics & Computer Sciences: Pure Mathematics, Applied Mathematics, Statistics

Faculty of Petroleum and Chemical Engineering: Petroleum Engineering, Chemical Engineering

Faculty of Sport Sciences: General Sport Sciences, Sport Management, Exercises Physiology, Motor Behavior

Faculty of Architecture & Urbanism: Architecture, Restoration of Historic Buildings

Faculty of Geography & Environmental Sciences: Geography and Urban & Rural Planning, Geomorphology & Meteorology, Environment,
Remote sensing and GIS

Faculty of Letters & Humanities: English Language and Literature, Persian Language and Literature, French Language and Literature, Political Sciences, Educational Sciences

Faculty of Theology and Islamic Studies: Philosophy &Islamic Wisdom, Arabic Language & Literature, Jurisprudence & the Fundamentals of Islamic Law, Law, Quranic & Hadith Studies, Islamic Knowledge

Faculty of Electrical & Computer Engineering: Biomedical Engineering, Power Engineering, Electrical Engineering, Computer Engineering, Mechatronics Engineering

Faculty of Modern Technologies: Industrial Engineering, Engineering Sciences, Computer Engineering (IT)

Facilities
Sports Facilities: indoor swimming pool, indoor sports hall for bodybuilding, volleyball, basketball, table tennis, futsal, and artificial turf fields.

Amenities: student dormitories and cafeterias (capacity 1800), health & counseling centers, bookstores, bakery, supermarket chain and...

Scientific facilities and research: laboratory equipment and advanced workshops.

Academic periodicals

Advances in Solid and Fluid Mechanics (ASFM)
Studies of Architecture, Urbanism and Environmental Sciences Journal (SAUES)
Journal of Studies on Literary Theory and Genres
Journal of Applied Material Science
Applied Geomorphology of Iran
Sport and Biomedical Sciences (in Persian)
Geographical studies of arid regions

Former chancellors

Prof. Mohammad Ali Zanganeh Asadi (2020–present)
Prof. Ali Asghar Movlavi (2018–2020)
Prof. Javad Hadadnia (2013-2018)
Dr. Abbas Mohammadian (2005-2013)
Dr. Abolfazl Alavi (2002-2005)
Dr. Mohsen Haddad Sabzevari (1995-2002)
Mohammad Hossein Amanpour (1995-1995 [6 months])
Abbas Mohammadian (1993-1995)
Hassan Alamolhodaei (1988-1993)
Mohammad Ali Talebi (1986-1988)

Memorandum of understanding

Hakim Sabzevari University Memorandum of Understanding with Paris 13 University, France, in 2015
Hakim Sabzevari University Memorandum of Understanding with University of Turin, Italy, in 2016
Hakim Sabzevari University Memorandum of Understanding with University of Lyon, France, in 2016
Hakim Sabzevari University Memorandum of Understanding with Herat University, Afghanistan, in 2017
Hakim Sabzevari University Memorandum of Understanding with German Academic Exchange Service, Germany, in 2017
Hakim Sabzevari University Memorandum of Understanding with Moscow State University, Russia, in 2019
Hakim Sabzevari University Memorandum of Understanding with Salahaddin University, Iraq, in 2019
Hakim Sabzevari University Memorandum of Understanding with Tishk (Ishik) International University, Iraq, in 2019
Hakim Sabzevari University Memorandum of Understanding with Laghman University, Afghanistan, in 2019
Hakim Sabzevari University Memorandum of Understanding with Sayed Jamaluddin Afghani University, Afghanistan, in 2019
Hakim Sabzevari University Memorandum of Understanding with University of Malakand, Pakistan, in 2013

See also
 Sabzevar University of Medical Sciences
 Islamic Azad University of Sabzevar

References

External links
 Official website of Hakim Sabzevari University 

1987 establishments in Iran
Buildings and structures in Razavi Khorasan Province
Educational institutions established in 1987
Education in Sabzevar County
Universities in Iran